Old Barnhill Building is a historic commercial building located at California, Moniteau County, Missouri.  It was built about 1892, and is a two-story, Italianate style red brick building.  It measures 25 feet by 60 feet and has a flat roof.  It features cast iron embellishments.

It was added to the National Register of Historic Places in 1982.

References

Commercial buildings on the National Register of Historic Places in Missouri
Italianate architecture in Missouri
Commercial buildings completed in 1892
Buildings and structures in Moniteau County, Missouri
National Register of Historic Places in Moniteau County, Missouri
1892 establishments in Missouri